The Blue Hour (Spanish: La hora azul), also known as Before Dawn, is a 2014 Peruvian drama film written, directed and co-produced by Evelyne Pegot in her directorial debut. It is based on the 2005 novel of the same name by Alonso Cueto. Starring Giovanni Ciccia, Jackelyn Vásquez and Rossana Fernández-Maldonado.

Synopsis 
It tells the story of a successful lawyer who, after discovering disquieting and disturbing facts from the past of his father's life, a prominent army commander during the country's internal armed conflict, begins to investigate for the truth of what happened.

Cast 
The actors participating in this film are:

 Giovanni Ciccia as Adrian Ormache
 Jackelyn Vásquez as Miriam
 Rossana Fernández-Maldonado as Claudia
 Lucho Cáceres
 Reynaldo Arenas
 Haydeé Cáceres

Production

Script 
In 2007, he tried to contact Alonso Cueto, author of the novel, but to no avail. 2 years ago he spoke with Alonso Cueto to finally adapt his novel to the cinema.

Financing 
In 2012, the film won the 2012 Feature Film Contest – MinCul Peru where it received S/.550,000 to start filming. In 2016, he won the First Feature Film Distribution Project Contest where he received S/.420,000 for commercial distribution.

Filming 
Principal photography lasted four weeks, from May to June 2013 in Lima and Ayacucho.

Release 
It initially premiered at the end of August 2014 at the Montreal International Film Festival. On April 21, 2015, it premiered at the Chicago Latino Film Festival. It was commercially released on October 13, 2016, in Peruvian theaters.

Awards

References

External links 

 

2014 films
2014 drama films
Peruvian drama films
La Soga Producciones films
2010s Spanish-language films
2010s Peruvian films
Films set in Peru
Films shot in Peru
Films about families
Films based on novels
2014 directorial debut films